Eporidia is a genus of moths of the family Crambidae. It contains only one species, Eporidia dariusalis, is found in Cameroon, the Republic of Congo, the Democratic Republic of Congo, Equatorial Guinea, Ghana and Togo.

References

Pyraustinae
Crambidae genera
Taxa named by Francis Walker (entomologist)